Fearby is a village and civil parish in the Harrogate district of North Yorkshire, England. Nearby settlements include Healey, High Ellington and Swinton. The population of the parish was estimated at 130 in 2013.

History 
The village is first mentioned, as Federbi, in the Domesday Book which records a population of eight villagers and one smallholder.  The toponym is of uncertain derivation.  The element -by is of Old Norse origin, meaning "village", and the name could mean either "four villages" or "feather village".

Fearby was historically a township in the large ancient parish of Masham in the North Riding of Yorkshire.  It became part of the new ecclesiastical parish of Healey in 1849.  The civil parish of Fearby was formed in 1866.

Governance 
Until 1974 Fearby was part of Masham Rural District (before 1934 Masham Urban District) in the North Riding of Yorkshire.  It is now part of the Borough of Harrogate in North Yorkshire.  It lies within the Nidderdale Area of Outstanding Natural Beauty.

The parish now shares a grouped parish council, known as Fearby, Healey and District Parish Council, with Colsterdale, Ellingstring, Healey and Ilton cum Pott.

References

External links

Villages in North Yorkshire
Civil parishes in North Yorkshire